Drew Morgan (born December 2, 1994) is an American football wide receiver who is currently a free agent. He played college football at Arkansas.

High school career
Morgan attended Greenwood High School in Greenwood, Arkansas. He was ranked as the No. 7 player in Arkansas by Rivals and as the No. 13 prospect in the state by 247Sports, he walked on at Arkansas in 2012.

College career
In his freshman year Morgan played in 10 games at WR and on Special teams. In his junior year he led the team in catches (63), yards (843) and TD catches (10) and received an All-SEC Second-team honours.

Professional career
Morgan signed with the Miami Dolphins as an undrafted free agent on May 5, 2017. He was waived on September 2, 2017 and was signed to the Dolphins' practice squad the next day. He signed a reserve/future contract with the Dolphins on January 1, 2018.

On September 1, 2018, Morgan was waived by the Dolphins.

In 2019, Morgan joined the Memphis Express of the Alliance of American Football, but did not make the final roster. He was re-signed to a contract on March 25, 2019, while on the team's rights list. He was activated to the roster on March 26. The league ceased operations in April 2019.

References

External links
Arkansas Razorbacks bio

1994 births
Living people
American football wide receivers
People from Greenwood, Arkansas
Players of American football from Arkansas
Arkansas Razorbacks football players
Miami Dolphins players
Memphis Express (American football) players